Patricia Stephens Due (December 9, 1939 – February 7, 2012) was one of the leading African-American civil rights activists in the United States, especially in her home state of Florida. Along with her sister Priscilla and others trained in nonviolent protest by CORE, Due spent 49 days in one of the nation's first jail-ins, refusing to pay a fine for sitting in a Woolworth's "White only" lunch counter in Tallahassee, Florida in 1960. Her eyes were damaged by tear gas used by police on students marching to protest such arrests, and she wore dark glasses for the rest of her life. She served in many leadership roles in CORE and the NAACP, fighting against segregated stores, buses, theaters, schools, restaurants, and hotels, protesting unjust laws, and leading one of the most dangerous voter registration efforts in the country in northern Florida in the 1960s.

With her daughter, Tananarive, Due wrote Freedom in the Family: a Mother-Daughter Memoir of the Fight for Civil Rights, documenting the struggle she participated in, initially as a student at Florida A&M University, and later working for civil rights organizations and Florida communities, sometimes in partnership with her husband, civil rights attorney John D. Due, Jr.

Biography
Patricia Stephens was born on December 9, 1939 in Quincy, Florida to Lottie Mae (née Powell) and Horace Walter Stephens. She was the second of three children. In 1963, she married Florida A&M University (FAMU) law student John D. Due, Jr., who went on to become a prominent civil rights attorney. The couple had three daughters.

Due's university studies were repeatedly interrupted by protests and arrests that sometimes got her suspended, as well as speaking and fund-raising tours. Though she entered Florida A&M University in 1957, she did not receive her degree until 1967.

Civil rights activism

Due and her sister Priscilla started fighting segregation when Due was 13 by insisting on being served at the "white only" window of their local Dairy Queen (name of business: The Polar Bear) in Belle Glade, instead of the "colored" window.

During the summer of 1959, the sisters attended a nonviolent resistance workshop organized by the Congress of Racial Equality (CORE). On February 20, 1960, eleven FAMU students, including Patricia and Priscilla, were arrested for ordering food at a "white only" Woolworth lunch counter. On March 12, dozens of FAMU and Florida State University students who participated in sit-ins at McCrory’s and Woolworth’s were arrested. A thousand students began marching from the FAMU campus toward downtown Tallahassee, but were stopped by Police officers with teargas. At the head of the march, Due was teargassed right in the face, and suffered permanent eye damage.

Due and the other sit-in participants were tried and found guilty on March 17, 1960. Eight refused to pay the $300 fine, deciding instead to go to jail. Eight students served 49 days at the Leon County Jail: FAMU students Patricia and Priscilla Stephens, John Broxton, Barbara Broxton and William Larkins, and three other students—Clement Carney, Angelina Nance, and 16-year-old high school student Henry Marion Steele (son of activist pastor Rev. C.K. Steele). 

The "jail-in" gained nationwide attention, and the students received a supportive telegram from Martin Luther King Jr. Due sent a letter to baseball pioneer Jackie Robinson, who published it in a column he wrote. Robinson later sent the jailed students diaries so they could write down their experiences. After the jail-in, Due and the others traveled the country in speaking tours to publicize the civil rights movement. She met with such leaders as Eleanor Roosevelt and author James Baldwin, and was jailed on numerous occasions as a leader in the movement.

Death
Patricia Stephens Due died in 2012, aged 72, following a battle with cancer.

Bibliography
 Freedom in the Family: a Mother-Daughter Memoir of the Fight for Civil Rights with Tananarive Due (Ballantine, 2003)

Honors
Due received the Eleanor Roosevelt Award for Outstanding Leadership, the Gandhi Award for Outstanding Work in Human Relations, and the Florida Freedom Award from the NAACP. She was also awarded an honorary doctorate from her alma mater, Florida A&M University.
 
In 2008, the National Hook-Up of Black Women Inc. honored Due at its national convention.

In 2017, Due was inducted into the Florida Civil Rights Hall of Fame.

Legacy
In February 2010, Florida A&M University (FAMU) students gathered on campus to re-enact the sit-ins, jail-in, and protest march that had occurred 50 years previously in Tallahassee.
 The John Due and Patricia Stephens Due Freedom Endowed Scholarship provides $1000 annually to a FAMU student who plans to use the legacy of the civil rights movement to do his or her part to make a better nation.
Patricia Due was honored by Tallahassee Mayor John R. Marks, who issued a proclamation declaring May 11, 2011 as Patricia Stephens Due Day.'''

Interviews
 Patricia Stevens Due and Tananarive Due on NPR, Fresh Air from WHYY, January 16, 2003 (Audio)

References

Works about Patricia Stephens Due
 Letter from Leon County Jail: Patricia Stephens Due and the Tallahassee, Florida Civil Rights Movement; Master's thesis by Marna Rinaldo Weston, available through Florida State University theses listings.

1939 births
2012 deaths
African-American activists
Activists for African-American civil rights
American civil rights activists
Deaths from cancer in Georgia (U.S. state)
Florida A&M University alumni
History of civil rights in the United States
Nonviolence advocates
People from Quincy, Florida
Place of death missing
20th-century African-American women
Women civil rights activists
21st-century African-American people
21st-century African-American women
American civil rights activists (civil rights movement)